Clitopilus amygdaliformis is a species of fungus in the family Entolomataceae native to China, formally described in 2007.

References

Entolomataceae
Fungi of China
Fungi described in 2007